Michael Anthony Nunes (born 10 October 1947) is a Jamaican sailor. He competed at the 1968 Summer Olympics and the 1972 Summer Olympics.

References

External links
 

1947 births
Living people
Jamaican male sailors (sport)
Olympic sailors of Jamaica
Sailors at the 1968 Summer Olympics – Flying Dutchman
Sailors at the 1972 Summer Olympics – Dragon
Sportspeople from Kingston, Jamaica
20th-century Jamaican people